An Arcadian Maid is a 1910 American silent drama film directed by D. W. Griffith and starring Mary Pickford. It was produced and distributed by the Biograph Company.

Premise
Mary Pickford plays Priscilla an unemployed maid who finds work at a farm.  There she meets a no-good peddler who starts flirting with her and makes her fall in love with him.  He runs up a gambling bill and asks her to help him pay his debts or he won't be able to marry her.

Synopsis
Fate sometimes overtakes those who betray trusting innocence and does it so forcibly that there can be no question of the result. Here is a villain who induces a trusting girl to commit a robbery. But his ill-gotten gains do him no good. In a brawl on the train he either falls or is thrown out, and later falls dead at the feet of the girl he has deceived. Just how he got to where the girl was in the woods is not quite clear, but perhaps for dramatic purposes it is not altogether necessary. She, realising the probable results of taking her employer’s money, secures it from the body and returns it before the loss is discovered.

Cast
Mary Pickford as Priscilla
Mack Sennett as The Peddlar
George Nichols as The Man of the House
Kate Bruce as The Lady of the House

See also
 List of American films of 1910

References

External links 

 An Arcadian Maid on YouTube

1910 films
1910 drama films
American silent short films
1910s English-language films
Biograph Company films
American black-and-white films
Films directed by D. W. Griffith
1910 short films
Silent American drama films
Articles containing video clips
1910s American films